Tim Celen (born 26 February 1998) is a Belgian Para-cyclist who represented Belgium at the Paralympic Games.

Career
Celen represented Belgium at the 2016 Summer Paralympics. He again represented Belgium at the 2020 Summer Paralympics where he won a silver medal in the Road race T1–2 event and a bronze medal in the men's road time trial T1–2 event.

References

Living people
1998 births
Belgian male cyclists
People from Geel
Cyclists at the 2016 Summer Paralympics
Cyclists at the 2020 Summer Paralympics
Medalists at the 2020 Summer Paralympics
Paralympic medalists in cycling
Paralympic bronze medalists for Belgium
Paralympic silver medalists for Belgium
Cyclists from Antwerp Province
20th-century Belgian people
21st-century Belgian people